The Freedom of Information (Scotland) Act 2002 (asp 13) was an Act of the Scottish Parliament passed in 2002. It covers public bodies over which the Scottish Parliament has jurisdiction, fulfilling a similar purpose to the UK-level Freedom of Information Act 2000.  It, too, came into force at the beginning of 2005.

Not all public bodies situated in Scotland fall under this remit - Scottish-based departments of the Ministry of Defence, for example, are not subject to the Scottish Parliament, and thus would be covered by the 2000 Act not the 2002 Act. Similarly the Scottish parts of UK-wide bodies such as the Forestry Commission (which is headquartered in Scotland) are subject to the 2000 Act rather than the 2002 Act, even though they fall within the remit of the Scottish Parliament. The Act also created a Scottish Information Commissioner, whose duties were similar to those of the Information Commissioner, but limited to the bodies covered by the 2002 Act.

Whilst the two Acts are similar in principle, there are some significant differences in implementation; as a rule, the Scottish Act is more strongly worded. For example, the Scottish test for public interest is stated in terms of "substantial prejudice" rather than "prejudice", which is clearly a higher standard, and imposes a stricter time limit in cases where public interest has to be considered. It contains explicit mention of disability access rights and the duties incumbent on a body which does not have the information requested, both of which are lacking in the 2000 Act, and provides for an objective test (rather than "the reasonable opinion of a qualified person") to determine if the public interest means information should be withheld.

The 2002 Act established a Scottish Information Commissioner, but no tribunal; any appeals against the Commissioner would go to the Court of Session.

See also
Freedom of information in the United Kingdom
Freedom of Information (Amendment) (Scotland) Act 2013

References

External links
Stationery Office text of the Freedom of Information (Scotland) 2002 Act
Recent FOI disclosures by the Scottish Government
Scottish Information Commissioner website - with quick step guides and information for individuals and public bodies relating to the Freedom of Information Act

Acts of the Scottish Parliament 2002
Government of Scotland
Data laws of the United Kingdom
Freedom of information legislation in the United Kingdom